First Lady of Paraguay (Spanish: Primera Dama de Paraguay), also called First Lady of the Nation (Spanish: Primera Dama de la Nación), is the official post of the wife (or designated person) of the president of Paraguay. The official workplace of the Paraguayan first lady is Mburuvicha Róga. The current first lady of Paraguay is Silvana López Moreira, wife of President Mario Abdo Benítez.

Structure

According to Paraguayan law, the Office of the First Lady of the Nation depends structurally and financially on the presidency of the republic. The first lady exercises her duties through the REPADEH (Red Paraguaya para el Desarrollo Humano) Foundation, focused mainly in social and health affairs.

With the exception of a 14-month period between 2012–2013, Paraguay did not have a president's wife as First Lady for a decade, between 2008 and 2018. As Fernando Lugo, who was elected President in 2008, was unmarried, he designated his elder sister, Mercedes Lugo, as First Lady. After Lugo was impeached and succeeded by Federico Franco, Franco's wife Emilia Alfaro de Franco assumed the post; however, Franco's successor, Horacio Cartes, one day after assuming the presidency, ended the title of First Lady instead of handing it to his estranged wife, María Montaña de Cartes.

Partial list of first ladies

References

External links
  
ABC Color: Galería de primeras damas paraguayas 
  

 
Paraguay